The Colombia women's national under-20 football team represents Colombia in international women's football at under-20 competitions and are controlled by the Colombian Football Federation. They are a member of the CONMEBOL.

Fixtures and results

 Legend

2022

 Fixtures and results (Colombia Under 20)

Competitive record
*Draws include knockout matches decided on penalty kicks.
**Gold background colour indicates that the tournament was won.
***Red border colour indicates tournament was held on home soil.

 Champions   Runners-up  Third Place   Fourth place

FIFA U-20 Women's World Cup

South American Under-20 Women's Football Championship

Honours
FIFA U-20 Women's World Cup:
 Fourth place (1): 2010
 South American Under-20 Women's Football Championship
 Runners-up (1): 2010
 Third place (3): 2012, 2014, 2015
Bolivarian Games
 Winners (2): 2013 Trujillo, 2017 Santa Marta
South American Games
 Runners-up (1): 2018 Cochabamba

Notes

References

External links
 FCF Official website
 FIFA profile

F
South American women's national under-20 association football teams